Abdullah Al-Shammeri (born 24 November 1991) is a Saudi Arabian football goalkeeper who currently plays for Abha.

Career
At the club level, Abdullah Al-Shammeri started his career at Al-Nassr.

Honours

Clubs
Al-Nassr
Saudi Professional League 2013–14
Saudi Professional League 2014–15
Saudi Crown Prince Cup: 2013–14

References

Saudi Arabian footballers
Al Nassr FC players
1991 births
Living people
Al-Fayha FC players
Al-Raed FC players
Al-Kawkab FC players
Abha Club players
Sportspeople from Riyadh
Saudi First Division League players
Saudi Professional League players
Association football goalkeepers